Olivier Marceau (born 30 January 1973 in Fontenay-aux-Roses, Hauts-de-Seine) is an athlete from France, who competes in triathlon.

A member of the Poissy Triathlon Club he competed at the first Olympic triathlon at the 2000 Summer Olympics.  He took seventh place with a total time of 1:49:18.03.

Four years later, at the 2004 Summer Olympics, Marceau competed again.  This time he competed on the Swiss team, placing eighth with a time of 1:52:44.36.

References
sports-reference

1973 births
Living people
People from Fontenay-aux-Roses
French male triathletes
Olympic triathletes of France
Olympic triathletes of Switzerland
Swiss male triathletes
Triathletes at the 2000 Summer Olympics
Triathletes at the 2004 Summer Olympics
Triathletes at the 2008 Summer Olympics
Sportspeople from Hauts-de-Seine
21st-century French people
20th-century French people